Global Investors Summit, officially the Invest Madhya Pradesh Global Investors Summit or GIS is a biennial business summit organized by Government of Madhya Pradesh in Indore, the commercial capital of central India to attract domestic and foreign investment for development of the state. Based on the theme– India's Growth Centre and aimed at bringing together business leaders, investors, corporations, thought leaders, policy and opinion makers; the summit serves as a perfect platform to understand and explore business opportunities in the State of Madhya Pradesh.

In 2019, the summit was held with the title 'Magnificent MP Summit' by then Chief Minister Kamal Nath in Indore.

 GIS 2007 - Signed 102 MOUs worth Rs 1.20 Trillion
 GIS 2010 - Signed 107 MOUs for setting up projects worth Rs 2.35 Trillion
 GIS 2012 - Signed 259 MOUs for setting up projects worth Rs 4.31 Trillion
 GIS 2016 - 2630 Investments proposed worth ₹5.63 Trillion.

Focus Sectors
The primary focus sectors of the summit are

 Agribusiness & Food processing
 Automobile & Engineering
 Defence
 IT/ITES & ESDM
 Renewable Energy
 Pharmaceuticals
 Textile
 Tourism
 Urban Development

GIS 2012-2014 Highlights 

GIS 2014 was organized from 8–10 October 2014 in Brilliant Convention Centre, Indore and was inaugurated by the prime minister of India, Shri Narendra Modi. Top names in Indian business who participated in the event were  Mukesh Ambani, Anil Ambani, Cyrus Mistry, YC Deveshwar and Gautam Adani etc. Six countries including Canada, Australia, and South Africa were partner-nations at the event. Ambassadors from 21 countries attended the summit. GIS 2012 was held in Indore from 28–30 October 2012 and many projects and MoUs were signed in the three days of the summit. Of these investment plans, major investment are:

 Setting up an air cargo hub at Indore, for which 500 hectares of land would be acquired near existing Devi Ahilyabai Holkar Airport.
 Reliance Anil Dhirubhai Ambani Group will enhance its integrated power plants in Madhya Pradesh at an investment of Rs 25000 crores.
 HUDCO to invest Rs 2,000 crore to strengthen urban water supply and urban infrastructure development schemes.
 MTech Metals & Mining has inked MoU to invest Rs 9,000 crore in an integrated steel plant and an auto park to be set up in Jabalpur division.
 Future Group plans to invest Rs 2,500 crore for an integrated food park and to create jobs for 21,400 people.
 Vellore Institute of Technology plans to invest Rs 500 crore to set up a university in the state.
 Bharat Forge will invest Rs 1,880 crore to set up a steel plant at Shahdol and auto-component plants near Indore.
 Tata Consultancy Services will invest Rs 410 crore in Indore to create 12,000 jobs.
 Steel Authority of India Limited plans to invest Rs 5000 crore in an iron plant at Chhatarpur.
 Stem Learning Ltd plans to invest Rs 80 crore to train 20,000 students
 Rockland Hospital will invest Rs 300 crore in a super-speciality hospital.
 NTPC has inked an MoU to invest Rs 9000 crore to set up a 1,200 MW thermal power station at Khargon.
 American Copper Limited plans to invest Rs 1856 crore in a 500 metric tonnes per annum copper plant in Balaghat.

GIS 2016 Highlights
The Global Investors Summit 2016 was organised on 22 and 23 October at Brilliant Convention Centre, Indore. On 21 October 2016, the Global CEO conclave was held where 150 Ambassadors of partner countries, CEOs of industrial groups and representatives from abroad shared dinner with the Chief Minister of Madhya Pradesh and discussed investment opportunities in the state. GIS 2016 was partnered by six countries the United Kingdom, UAE, Singapore, Japan and South Korea. The foundation stone for state's Make in Madhya Pradesh initiative was laid by chief minister at the event. GIS 2016 was inaugurated by Finance Minister of India, Shri Arun Jaitley. Baba Ramdev and Gopichand Hinduja attended the event for the first time. Top names in Indian business who participated in the event were Anil Ambani, Kumar Mangalam Birla. The valedictory session was presided over by Minister for external affairs, Sushma Swaraj. Total number of MOUs signed and total investment figures are yet to be confirmed by the government.

See also

Government of Madhya Pradesh
Economy of Madhya Pradesh

References

Economy of Madhya Pradesh
Economy of Indore
Business conferences in India
Investment in India